Diker is a surname. Notable people with the surname include:
 Ayse Diker (born 1984), Turkish swimmer
 Dan Diker, American secretary general of the World Jewish Congress
  (born 1947), Turkish politician